Nelliyady or Nelliadi or Nelliyadi is a town located 7 km from the City of Point Pedro, Jaffna District, Sri Lanka. In local Tamil Language it translates to By the bottom of Indian gooseberry.   First ever suicide attack by Tamil Tigers was carried out in this town in 1987, killing tens of Sri Lankan Army soldiers.

There is a location in Karnataka, India with the same name.

See also 

Captain Miller
Nelliyadi
Indian gooseberry

Towns in Jaffna District
Vadamarachchi South West DS Division